William I (–1087), usually known as William the Conqueror, was King of England from 1066.

William I may also refer to:

Kings
 William I of Bimbia (fl. 1850s)
 William I, German Emperor (1797–1888)
 William I of Scotland (died 1214), known as William the Lion
 William I of Sicily (died 1166)
 William I of the Netherlands and Luxembourg (1772–1843)
 William I of Württemberg (1781–1864)

Nobles
 William of Champlitte (died 1209), Prince of Achaea
 William le Gros, 1st Earl of Albemarle (died 1179)
 William I Talvas (c. 995–after 1030), seigneur of Alençon
 William Iron Arm (before 1010–1046), Duke of Apulia
 William I de la Roche (died 1287), Duke of Athens
 William I of Aquitaine (died 918)
 William I, Duke of Bavaria (1330–1389)
 William I of Béarn (died 1173)
 William I of Bures (died 1142), French crusader
 William I, Count of Burgundy (1020–1087)
 William I of Cagliari (c. 1160–1214)
 William I of Cerdanya (1068–1095)
 William I of Gascony (died 848)
 William I of Geneva (fl. 1190s)
 William I of Guelders and Jülich (1364–1402) 
 William I, Count of Hainaut (1286–1337)
 William I, Lord of Douglas (died ca. 1214)
 William I, Elector of Hesse (1743–1821)
 William I, Landgrave of Hesse (1466–1515)
 William I, Margrave of Meissen (1343–1407), known as William I., the One-eyed
 William I, Count of Holland (c. 1167–1222)
 Guglielmo I Gonzaga (1538–1587), Duke of Mantua
 William I of Montferrat (fl. 924)
 William I of Montpellier (fl. 980s)
 William I, Count of Nassau-Siegen (1487–1559)
 William I, Count of Nevers (c. 1030–after 1083)
 William I of Normandy (c. 900–942)
 William the Silent (1533–1584), Prince of Orange
 William I of Provence (c. 950–993)
 Uilleam I, Earl of Ross (died 1274)
 William de Warenne, 1st Earl of Surrey (died 1088)
 William I, Bishop of Utrecht (died 1076)